Gasterocome pannosaria is a moth in the family Geometridae. It is found from northern India, Nepal, Bhutan and Indochina to Sundaland and Taiwan.

The wingspan is 34–39 mm.

Subspecies
Gasterocome pannosaria pannosaria (India)
Gasterocome pannosaria contacta (Warren, 1899)
Gasterocome pannosaria macarista Prout, 1932 (Borneo)
Gasterocome pannosaria orta (Bastelberger, 1911) (Taiwan)
Gasterocome pannosaria sinicaria (Leech, 1897)

References

Moths described in 1868
Boarmiini